Prof. S. B. S. Abayakoon is the current chairman of Engineering council Sri Lanka(ECSL) and the former Vice-Chancellor of University of Peradeniya, Sri Lanka. Prior to that, he was the Dean of the Faculty of Engineering for four and a half years. He is a Senior professor of Civil Engineering, at Faculty of Engineering, University of Peradeniya. He was appointed the 20th vice-chancellor of the university in August 2009. He completed his primary and secondary education at St/Sylvester's College, Kandy.

Education
Abayakoon was educated at the St. Sylvester's College, Kandy. Then he entered to the University of Peradeniya faculty of engineering for his higher education and completed the bachelor's degree in civil engineering in 1979 with a First Class Honours degree. He received his post graduate degrees, Master of Applied Science and Doctor of Philosophy, from University of British Columbia, Canada in 1983 and in 1987 respectively.

See also
University of Peradeniya

References

External links
University of Peradeniya signs MoU with UND

Sri Lankan academic administrators
Academic staff of the University of Peradeniya
Living people
1958 births
Vice-Chancellors of the University of Peradeniya
Alumni of St. Sylvester's College